The Velveteen Lop is a breed of rabbit that is a cross between the rex rabbit and the English Lop.

History
Breeder Virginia Menden began developing the breed in 1991, with the goal of creating a rabbit that had a semi-arched body shape and fur similar to that of the Mini Rex. Menden named the breed after the children's story The Velveteen Rabbit. The breed became eligible to be shown at ARBA sanctioned shows in February 2019, but is not currently allowed to compete for Best of Show.

Appearance 
The Velveteen Lop's coat should feel short and plush to the touch. The fur is thick creating a velvet-plush like texture. The coat can be a variety of colors or patterns, including tri & harlequin. Color standards are those of the Rex Rabbit & English Lop. The overall goal is to have the fur content and quality of the Rex rabbit, with the build and ear length of an English lop. It should have a semi-arched body shape, and the chest should be full. The head should be wedge-shaped. The ears should be low on the rabbit's head, and should measure at least 14 inches from tip to tip. Healthy rabbits weigh 6 to 12 pounds, as a medium sized rabbit. Because they are a newer breed & not a fully recognized by some registries (working), size & type may vary slightly.

Lifespan
Velveteen Lops can live for 5-11 years.

References

Rabbit breeds